The Australian and New Zealand Association of Bellringers, known as ANZAB, is the organisation responsible for the promotion of English-style "full circle ringing" – namely change ringing and method ringing in bell towers with a peal of bells – across Australia and New Zealand.

History 
ANZAB was formed in 1962, through the renaming of the New South Wales Association of Change Ringers and the inclusion of ringers from other Australian states and New Zealand. Its purpose is, "To encourage and provide for the installation, restoration, augmentation and maintenance of rings of bells and to provide technical, financial and other assistance in respect thereof." The NSW association was formed in 1946 by visiting Royal Navy sailors from the British Pacific Fleet who brought their skills to the six existing towers around Sydney.

Before the formation of the association, a quarter peal had not been rung in NSW during the previous 40 years. As of 2014, ANZAB has around 500 members who ring at 64 bell towers.

Functions 
Aside from regular religious services, ringing is often conducted for special occasions such as state funerals, anniversaries, memorials and other locally or nationally significant events. For example, there was a national simultaneous ringing of bells in celebration of the centenary of the Federation of Australia on 1 January 2001. ANZAB is affiliated with the Central Council of Church Bell Ringers, founded in 1891 and based in the United Kingdom. While most bells are hung in churches, there is no expectation of religious affiliation among the ringers themselves.

ANZAB has branches in most Australian states, and these branches foster and encourage ringing at a local level through education and training. The branches organise regional ringing events, such as striking competitions, local advanced ringing sessions, and inter-tower visits and tours. ANZAB itself holds an annual ringing festival in conjunction with its Annual General Meeting. The location of the festival changes from year to year and is usually held in locations where two or more towers are easily accessible.

ANZAB publishes a quarterly journal, Ringing Towers, containing articles of general interest to bellringers, reports of social and ringing events in Australia and New Zealand, and all Quarter Peals and Peals rung for ANZAB or in ANZAB territory. The state branches also publish newsletters or websites related to their activities. In recognition of the lifesaving cardiopulmonary resuscitation (CPR) provided to Alan Coates who suffered a heart-attack while ringing in 2015, ANZAB now provides for first-aid and CPR training for two members in each tower.

ANZAB members also ring changes on handbells, a practice which was popularised in the United Kingdom during the Second World War when church bells were not allowed to be rung. As Carillon bells are not rung in full-circle style they are not affiliated with, and have been criticised by, ANZAB.

List of bellringing towers
Bells are usually tuned to a Diatonic major scale, with the tenor bell being the tonic (or key) note of the scale. Some towers have extra bells, indicated by the + sign, which are used to allow different subsets of the full number to be rung, still to a diatonic scale.

By convention, the weights of the tenor bells are shown in the imperial units: Hundredweights-quarters-pounds.

See also 
 Dove's Guide for Church Bell Ringers
 North American Guild of Change Ringers
 Alan Coates

References

Bibliography

External links
 
 ABC Television Compass episode "The bells of St. Leonard's", first broadcast 28 April 2013.
 ABC Radio National Into the Music episode The Bell Ringers of St. Mary's, first broadcast 5 April 2014.

Bell ringing organizations
1946 establishments in Australia
1962 establishments in New Zealand
Music organisations based in Australia
Articles containing video clips